This list of birds of South India includes bird from India south approximately of the Narmada River.

Rollapadu in Andhra Pradesh, Nagarhole National Park) and Bandipur National Park in Karnataka; Rajamalai (Eravikulam National Park) and Periyar National Park in Kerala; Mudumalai National Park, Udhagamandalam, Indira Gandhi Wildlife Sanctuary in Anamalai, Vedanthangal and Point Calimere Wildlife and Bird Sanctuary in Kodikkarai, Tamil Nadu are notable bird watching locations in South India.

Francolins and spurfowls
Painted francolin, Francolinus pictus
Grey francolin, Francolinus pondicerianus
Red spurfowl, Galloperdix spadicea
Painted spurfowl, Galloperdix lunulata

Quails and buttonquails
Blue-breasted quail, Coturnix chinensis
Common quail, Coturnix coturnix
Rain quail, Coturnix coromandelica
Jungle bush quail, Perdicula asiatica
Rock bush quail, Perdicula argoondah
Painted bush quail, Perdicula erythrorhyncha
Small buttonquail, Turnix sylvatica
Yellow-legged buttonquail, Turnix tanki
Barred buttonquail, Turnix suscitator

Galliformes

Red junglefowl, Gallus gallus
Grey junglefowl, Gallus sonneratti
Indian peafowl, Pavo cristatus

Geese and ducks

Fulvous whistling-duck, Dendrocygna bicolor
Lesser whistling-duck, Dendrocygna javanica
Knob-billed duck, Sarkidiornis melanotus
Pink-headed duck, Rhodonessa caryophyllacea (Historic)
Cotton pygmy-goose, Nettapus coromandalianus
Bar-headed goose, Anser indicus
Ruddy shelduck, Tadorna ferruginea
Common shelduck, Tadorna tadorna
Gadwall, Mareca strepera
Eurasian wigeon, Mareca penelope
Mallard, Anas platyrhynchos
Indian spot-billed duck, Anas poecilorhyncha
Common teal, Anas crecca
Northern pintail, Anas acuta
Northern shoveler, Spatula clypeata
Garganey, Spatula querquedula
Red-crested pochard, Rhodonessa rufina
Common pochard, Aythya ferina
Ferruginous pochard, Aythya nyroca
Tufted duck, Aythya fuligula

Woodpeckers

Eurasian wryneck, Jynx torquilla
Speckled piculet, Picumnus innominatus
Brown-capped pygmy woodpecker, Dendrocopos nanus
Fulvous-breasted woodpecker, Dendrocopos macei (northern Eastern Ghats)
Yellow-crowned woodpecker, Dendrocopos mahrattenis
Rufous woodpecker, Celeus brachyurus
Heart-spotted woodpecker, Hemicircus canente
White-bellied woodpecker, Dryocopus javensis
Lesser yellownape, Picus chlorolophus
Greater yellownape, Picus flavinucha
Streak-throated woodpecker, Picus xanthopygaeus
Common flameback, Dinopium javanese
Black-rumped flameback, Dinopium benghalense
Greater flameback, Chrysocolaptes lucidus
White-naped woodpecker, Chrysocalptes festivus

Barbets

Brown-headed barbet, Psilopogon zeylanicus
White-cheeked barbet, Psilopogon viridis
Malabar barbet, Psilopogon malabaricus
Coppersmith barbet, Psilopogon haemacephalus

Hornbills

Malabar grey hornbill, Ocyceros griseus
Indian grey hornbill, Ocyceros birostris
Malabar pied hornbill, Anthracoceros coronatus
Oriental pied hornbill, Anthracoceros albirostris
Great hornbill, Buceros bicornis

Common hoopoe, trogon and rollers
Common hoopoe, Upupa epops
Malabar trogon, Harpactes fasciatus
European roller, Coracias garrulus
Indian roller, Coracias benghalensis
Dollarbird, Eurystomus orientalis

Kingfishers

Pied kingfisher, Ceryle rudis
Common kingfisher, Alcedo atthis
Blue-eared kingfisher, Alcedo meninting
Oriental dwarf kingfisher, Ceyx erithacus
Stork-billed kingfisher, Pelargopsis capensis
White-throated kingfisher, Halcyon smyrnensis
Black-capped kingfisher, Halcyon pileata
Collared kingfisher, Todiramphus chloris

Bee-eaters

Blue-bearded bee-eater, Nyctyornis athertoni
Green bee-eater, Merops orientalis
Blue-cheeked bee-eater, Merops persicus
Blue-tailed bee-eater, Merops philippinus
European bee-eater, Merops apiaster
Chestnut-headed bee-eater, Merops leschenaulti

Cuckoos and malkohas

Pied cuckoo
Chestnut-winged cuckoo
Large hawk-cuckoo
Common hawk-cuckoo
Indian cuckoo
Eurasian cuckoo, Cuculus canorus
Lesser cuckoo
Banded bay cuckoo
Grey-bellied cuckoo
Drongo cuckoo
Asian koel
Green-billed malkoha
Blue-faced malkoha
Sirkeer malkoha

Coucals, parrots and parakeets

Greater coucal
Lesser coucal
Vernal hanging parrot
Alexandrine parakeet
Rose-ringed parakeet
Plum-headed parakeet
Malabar parakeet

Swifts
Indian swiftlet
White-rumped needletail
Brown-backed needletail
Asian palm swift
Alpine swift
Common swift
Blyth's swift
House swift
Crested treeswift

Owls

Barn owl
Grass owl
Oriental bay owl
Pallid scops owl
Oriental scops owl
Collared scops owl
Jungle owlet
Spotted owlet
Forest owlet
Eurasian eagle owl
Spot-bellied eagle owl
Dusky eagle owl
Brown fish owl
Mottled wood owl
Brown wood owl
Brown hawk-owl
Short-eared owl

Frogmouth and nightjars
Sri Lanka frogmouth
Great eared nightjar
Grey nightjar
Large-tailed nightjar
Jerdon's nightjar
Indian nightjar
Savanna nightjar

Pigeons and doves

Rock pigeon
Nilgiri wood pigeon
Pale-capped pigeon
Oriental turtle dove
Laughing dove
Spotted dove
Red collared dove
Eurasian collared dove
Emerald dove
Orange-breasted green pigeon
Grey-fronted green pigeon
Yellow-footed green pigeon
Green imperial pigeon
Mountain imperial pigeon

Bustards and cranes
Indian bustard
Lesser florican
Sarus crane
Demoiselle crane
Common crane

Crakes and rails

Slaty-legged crake
Slaty-breasted rail
Water rail
Brown crake
White-breasted waterhen

Baillon's crake
Ruddy-breasted crake
Spotted crake
Watercock
Grey-headed swamphen
Common moorhen
Common coot

Sandgrouse
Chestnut-bellied sandgrouse
Painted sandgrouse

Woodcock, snipes and painted-snipe
Eurasian woodcock
Wood snipe
Pintail snipe
Swinhoe's snipe
Common snipe
Jack snipe
Greater painted-snipe

Godwits, curlews, and Tringa sandpipers

Black-tailed godwit
Bar-tailed godwit
Whimbrel
Eurasian curlew
Spotted redshank
Common redshank
Marsh sandpiper
Common greenshank
Green sandpiper
Wood sandpiper
Terek sandpiper
Common sandpiper
Ruddy turnstone
Asian dowitcher
Great knot
Red knot

Sanderling and stints
Sanderling
Little stint
Red-necked stint
Temminck's stint
Long-toed stint
Dunlin
Curlew sandpiper
Spoon-billed sandpiper
Broad-billed sandpiper
Ruff
Red-necked phalarope

Jacanas and large waders

Pheasant-tailed jacana
Bronze-winged jacana
Eurasian thick-knee
Great thick-knee
Eurasian oystercatcher
Black-winged stilt
Pied avocet
Crab-plover

Plovers
Pacific golden plover
Grey plover
Common ringed plover
Little ringed plover
Kentish plover
Lesser sand plover
Greater sand plover

Lapwings, coursers and pratincoles
Yellow-wattled lapwing
River lapwing
Red-wattled lapwing
Sociable lapwing
White-tailed lapwing
Grey-headed lapwing
Jerdon's courser
Indian courser
Oriental pratincole
Small pratincole

Jaegers and gulls
Pomarine jaeger
Parasitic jaeger
Sooty gull
Heuglin's gull
Caspian gull
Pallas's gull
Brown-headed gull
Black-headed gull
Slender-billed gull
Indian skimmer

Terns and noddies

Gull-billed tern
Caspian tern
River tern
Lesser crested tern
Great crested tern
Sandwich tern
Roseate tern
Black-naped tern
Common tern
Little tern
Saunders's tern
White-cheeked tern
Black-bellied tern
White tern
Bridled tern
Sooty tern
Whiskered tern
White-winged tern
Brown noddy
Lesser noddy

Osprey, bazas and kites

Osprey
Jerdon's baza
Black baza
Black-winged kite
Black kite
Brahminy kite

Sea and fish eagles
White-bellied sea eagle
Pallas's fish eagle
Grey-headed fish eagle

Vultures
Egyptian vulture
White-rumped vulture
Indian vulture
Eurasian griffon
Red-headed vulture

Eagles

Black eagle
Short-toed snake eagle
Crested serpent eagle
Indian spotted eagle
Greater spotted eagle
Tawny eagle
Steppe eagle
Bonelli's eagle
Booted eagle
Rufous-bellied eagle
Changeable hawk-eagle
Mountain hawk-eagle

Harrier
Eurasian marsh harrier
Pied harrier
Hen harrier
Pallid harrier
Montagu's harrier

Accipiters

Crested goshawk
Shikra
Besra
Eurasian sparrowhawk

Buzzards
Crested honey buzzard
White-eyed buzzard
Common buzzard
Long-legged buzzard

Falcons
Lesser kestrel
Common kestrel
Red-necked falcon
Amur falcon
Eurasian hobby
Oriental hobby
Laggar falcon
Peregrine falcon

Grebe, cormorants and darter

Little grebe
Little cormorant
Indian cormorant
Great cormorant
Darter

Tropicbirds and boobies
Red-billed tropicbird
White-tailed tropicbird
Masked booby
Brown booby
Red-footed booby

Egrets
Little egret
Western reef egret
Eastern great egret
Intermediate egret
Cattle egret

Herons

Grey heron
Purple heron
Indian pond heron
Little heron
Black-crowned night heron
Malayan night heron

Bitterns
Yellow bittern
Cinnamon bittern
Black bittern
Great bittern

Flamingos, ibises and spoonbill

Greater flamingo
Lesser flamingo
Glossy ibis
Black-headed ibis
Black ibis
Eurasian spoonbill

Storks

Painted stork
Asian openbill
Woolly-necked stork
White stork
Black stork
Black-necked stork
Lesser adjutant
Greater adjutant

Pelicans and frigatebirds

Great white pelican
Spot-billed pelican
Great frigatebird
Lesser frigatebird

Shearwaters and storm petrels
Wedge-tailed shearwater
Flesh-footed shearwater
Audubon's shearwater
Wilson's storm petrel
Swinhoe's storm petrel

Pitta, leafbirds, and shrikes

Indian pitta
Asian fairy bluebird
Blue-winged leafbird
Golden-fronted leafbird
Rufous-tailed shrike
Brown shrike
Bay-backed shrike
Long-tailed shrike
Great grey shrike

Treepies, crows and orioles

Rufous treepie
Grey treepie
White-bellied treepie
House crow
Large-billed crow
Indian golden oriole
Black-naped oriole
Black-hooded oriole

Cuckooshrikes and minivets

Ashy woodswallow
Large cuckooshrike
Black-winged cuckooshrike
Black-headed cuckooshrike
Rosy minivet
Ashy minivet
Small minivet
White-bellied minivet
Scarlet minivet
Bar-winged flycatcher-shrike

Drongos

Black drongo
Ashy drongo
White-bellied drongo
Bronzed drongo
Spangled drongo
Greater racket-tailed drongo

Fantails and woodshrikes
White-throated fantail
White-browed fantail
Black-naped monarch
Indian paradise flycatcher
Common iora
Large woodshrike
Common woodshrike

Thrushes

Blue-capped rock thrush
Blue rock thrush
Malabar whistling thrush
Pied thrush
Orange-headed thrush
Scaly thrush
Tickell's thrush
Eurasian blackbird

Flycatchers
Asian brown flycatcher
Rusty-tailed flycatcher
Brown-breasted flycatcher
Red-throated flycatcher
Kashmir flycatcher
Ultramarine flycatcher
Black-and-orange flycatcher
Yellow-rumped flycatcher
Nilgiri flycatcher
Verditer flycatcher

Shortwing and chats

White-bellied shortwing
Siberian rubythroat
Bluethroat
Indian blue robin
Oriental magpie robin
White-rumped shama
Brown rock-chat

Starlings and mynas

Chestnut-tailed starling
Brahminy starling
Rosy starling
Common starling
Asian pied starling
Common myna
Bank myna
Jungle myna
Hill myna

Nuthatches
Chestnut-bellied nuthatch
Velvet-fronted nuthatch

Creepers
Indian spotted creeper

Tits
Cinereous tit
White-naped tit
Himalayan black-lored tit

Martins
Sand martin
Pale martin
Grey-throated martin
Eurasian crag martin
Dusky crag martin

Swallows

Barn swallow
Pacific swallow
Wire-tailed swallow
Red-rumped swallow
Streak-throated swallow
Northern house martin

Bulbuls

Grey-headed bulbul
Black-crested bulbul
Red-whiskered bulbul
Red-vented bulbul
Yellow-throated bulbul
White-browed bulbul
Yellow-browed bulbul
Square-tailed bulbul

Cisticolas, prinias and white-eye

Zitting cisticola
Bright-headed cisticola
Rufous-fronted prinia
Rufescent prinia
Grey-breasted prinia
Jungle prinia
Ashy prinia
Plain prinia
Indian white-eye

Warblers

Pale-footed bush warbler
Grasshopper warbler
Paddyfield warbler
Blyth's reed warbler
Clamorous reed warbler
Booted warbler
Common tailorbird
Common chiffchaff
Dusky warbler
Tickell's leaf warbler
Sulphur-bellied warbler
Hume's warbler
Greenish warbler
Large-billed leaf warbler
Tytler's leaf warbler
Western crowned warbler
Green-crowned warbler
Lesser whitethroat
Orphean warbler

Grassbirds
Striated grassbird
Bristled grassbird
Broad-tailed grassbird

Laughingthrushes

Wynaad laughingthrush
Nilgiri laughingthrush
Banasura laughingthrush
Palani laughingthrush
Ashambu laughingthrush

Babblers and fulvetta

Abbott's babbler
Puff-throated babbler
Indian scimitar babbler
Rufous-fronted babbler
Tawny-bellied babbler
Dark-fronted babbler
Striped tit babbler
Yellow-eyed babbler
Common babbler
Large grey babbler
Rufous babbler
Jungle babbler
Yellow-billed babbler
Brown-cheeked fulvetta

Larks

Singing bushlark
Indian bushlark
Jerdon's bushlark
Ashy-crowned sparrow lark
Rufous-tailed lark
Greater short-toed lark
Crested lark
Malabar lark
Sykes's lark
Oriental skylark

Flowerpeckers
Thick-billed flowerpecker
Pale-billed flowerpecker
Nilgiri flowerpecker

Sunbirds and spiderhunter

Purple-rumped sunbird
Crimson-backed sunbird
Purple sunbird
Loten's sunbird
Crimson sunbird
Ruby-cheeked sunbird
Little spiderhunter
Olive-backed sunbird

Wagtails

Forest wagtail
White wagtail
White-browed wagtail
Citrine wagtail
Yellow wagtail
Grey wagtail

Pipits

Richard's pipit
Paddyfield pipit
Tawny pipit
Blyth's pipit
Long-billed pipit
Tree pipit
Olive-backed pipit
Red-throated pipit
Nilgiri pipit

Sparrows
House sparrow
Eurasian tree sparrow
Chestnut-shouldered petronia

Weavers
Black-breasted weaver
Streaked weaver
Baya weaver

Avadavats

Red avadavat
Green avadavat

Munias

Indian silverbill
White-rumped munia
Black-throated munia
Scaly-breasted munia
Tricoloured munia

Rosefinch and buntings
Common rosefinch
Crested bunting
Grey-necked bunting
Striolated bunting
Black-headed bunting
Red-headed bunting

See also 
 Birds of Coimbatore

References

South India
Tamil Nadu-related lists